Maksim Aleksandrovich Smirnov (born 14 February 2000) is a Russian professional footballer who plays for Yadro Saint Petersburg.

External links
 
 

2000 births
Living people
Russian footballers
Association football midfielders
FC Zenit Saint Petersburg players
FC Gorodeya players
FC Irtysh Omsk players
Belarusian Premier League players
Russian expatriate footballers
Expatriate footballers in Belarus